is a Buddhist temple located in Gifu, Gifu Prefecture, Japan. The temple has strong ties to both Saitō Dōsan and Oda Nobunaga. Gifu's Sōfuku-ji is famed throughout Japan for both the number of monks it produces and for its "Blood Ceiling". Shortly after its founding, it was also known as Kōsai-ji (弘済寺), but that name is no longer used. It is also one of the Mino Thirty-three Kannon.

History

Sōfuku-ji was originally built during the Kamakura period. However, because it suffered from much deterioration, Saitō Toshimasa moved and rebuilt the temple in 1511. In 1517, he gave it its current name. According to other stories, though, it was originally built in 1469, by Toki Shigeyori and Saitō Nagahiro, and it was officially opened in 1493.

When Oda Nobunaga moved into Gifu in 1567, he claimed Sōfuku-ji as his family temple. After Nobunaga and his son, Nobutada, died during the Incident at Honnō-ji in 1582, many of their personal treasures were moved to the temple.

In 1600, when Oda Hidenobu was responding to Ishida Mitsunari's call for assistance, Fukushima Masanori and Ikeda Terumasa sieged the castle and destroyed it during the Battle of Gifu Castle. Hidenobu's vassals died during this siege and, after the destruction of the castle, the blood-stained floor of the castles main tower was used to create the new "Blood Ceiling" in the temple.

During the Edo period, the temple received much support from the government and, as a result, prospered. It also became a prayer place for the Arisugawa-no-miya. Also, Tokugawa Iemitsu supported this temple immensely because his wet nurse as a child, Lady Kasuga, who was the daughter of Saitō Toshimitsu, a relative of Dōsan.

See also 
 For an explanation of terms concerning Japanese Buddhism, Japanese Buddhist art, and Japanese Buddhist temple architecture, see the Glossary of Japanese Buddhism.

References

Images 

Buildings and structures in Gifu
Buddhist temples in Gifu Prefecture